is a Japanese footballer who plays as a midfielder for Tokushima Vortis.

Career statistics

Notes

References

External links

2002 births
Living people
Association football people from Shiga Prefecture
Japanese footballers
Japan youth international footballers
Association football midfielders
Kyoto Sanga FC players